The Harold Washington Party was founded in Chicago in the late 1980s to represent the interests of the city's African-American population who felt disenchanted with the mainline Democratic Party. The party was created ahead of the 1989 special elections to fill the mayoral vacancy in Chicago created when Harold Washington, Chicago's first black mayor, died in office. It nominated a candidate for the 1989 special election for Chicago mayor as well as and several other offices in Cook County. The party's nominee in the 1989 special election, Timothy C. Evans received 41% of the vote. In 1990, a court decision denied Harold Washington Party nominees ballot access, which was reported a boon to the Democratic Party slate. Later, most of these officially became nonpartisan in the mid 1990s.

References

Political parties in Illinois
Government of Chicago
Black political parties in the United States
Political parties established in the 1980s
Political parties disestablished in the 1990s
Party